Ludwig van Beethoven's late string quartets are:
Opus 127: String Quartet No. 12 in E major (1825)
Opus 130: String Quartet No. 13 in B major (1825)
Opus 131: String Quartet No. 14 in C minor (1826)
Opus 132: String Quartet No. 15 in A minor (1825)
Opus 133: Große Fuge in B major (1825; originally the finale to Op. 130; it also exists in a piano four-hands transcription, Op. 134)
Opus 135: String Quartet No. 16 in F major (1826)

These six works are Beethoven's last major completed compositions. Although dismissed by musicians and audiences of Beethoven's day, they are now widely considered to be among the greatest musical compositions of all time, and have inspired many later composers.

Overview

Prince Nikolai Galitzine commissioned the first three quartets (12, 13 and 15) and in a letter dated 9 November 1822, offered to pay Beethoven "what you think proper" for them. Beethoven replied on 25 January 1823 with his price of 50 ducats for each opus. He composed the quartets in the sequence 12, 15, 13, 14, 16, writing 13 and 15 simultaneously.

Beethoven wrote these last quartets in failing health. In April 1825, he was bedridden and remained ill for about a month. The illness—or more precisely, his recovery from it—is remembered for having given rise to the deeply felt slow movement of the Fifteenth Quartet, which Beethoven called "Holy song of thanks (Heiliger Dankgesang) to the divinity, from one made well". He went on to complete the quartets now numbered Thirteenth, Fourteenth, and Sixteenth. The last work Beethoven completed was the substitute final movement of the thirteenth quartet, which replaced the extremely difficult Große Fuge.

The "ABC" quartets

Opp. 132, 130 and 131 are sometimes called the "ABC" quartets because of their keys: A minor, B major, and C minor. They are thematically linked by the four notes of the harmonic minor scale's second tetrachord. In his notes for the Quartetto Italiano's recording of all six quartets, A. David Hogarth writes:

Beethoven's "obsession at that time with the upper four notes of the harmonic minor scale" (Hogarth) predates these works. For an early example, see the first movement of his string trio, opus 9, no. 3.

Appraisal

Beethoven's late quartets went far beyond the comprehension of musicians and audiences of his time. One musician said, "we know there is something there, but we do not know what it is." Composer Louis Spohr called them "indecipherable, uncorrected horrors".

Opinion has changed considerably from the time of their first bewildered reception: these six quartets (including the Große Fuge) are widely considered to be among the greatest musical compositions of all time. The Frankfurt School philosopher Theodor Adorno, in particular, thought highly of them, and Igor Stravinsky called the Große Fuge "an absolutely contemporary piece of music that will be contemporary forever". Their forms and ideas inspired and continue to inspire musicians and composers, such as Richard Wagner and Béla Bartók. Wagner said that Op. 131's first movement "reveals the most melancholy sentiment expressed in music". Schubert's last musical wish was to hear Op. 131, which he did on 14 November 1828, five days before his death. Afterward, he remarked, "After this, what is left for us to write?" Beethoven also considered Op. 131 his most perfect single work.

Other versions
Arturo Toscanini and Felix Weingartner, among others, transcribed some of the late quartets for string orchestra.

Recordings
Ensembles that have recorded the complete late Beethoven quartets include:

 Alban Berg Quartet, EMI (studio early 80s)
 Alban Berg Quartet, EMI (rec. live 1989)
 Alexander String Quartet, Arte Nova
 Alexander String Quartet, Foghorn Classics
 Amadeus Quartet, DG
 Artemis Quartet, Virgin Classics
 Barylli Quartet
 Beethoven Quartet, Melodiya (rec. 1951-1972)
 Belcea Quartet
 Borodin Quartet, Chandos
 Brentano String Quartet, Aeon (rec. 2012)
 Budapest String Quartet, Bridge (rec. 1941-60)
 Budapest String Quartet, Sony (rec. 1958-61)
 Busch Quartet, various labels (rec. 1933-41; no Große Fuge)
 Cleveland Quartet, RCA Red seal (1970s)
 Cleveland Quartet, Telarc (1990s)
 Colorado Quartet, Parnassus (rec. 2004-06)
 Ehnes Quartet, Onyx Classics (2020-2022)
 Emerson String Quartet, DG
 Endellion String Quartet, Warner Classics (2005–06)
 Fine Arts Quartet, Everest/Concert-Disc (rec. 1960-65)
 Gewandhaus-Quartett, New Classical Adventure (rec. live 1985-98)
 Guarneri Quartet, RCA Red Seal, Philips
 Hagen Quartett, DG
 Hollywood String Quartet, Testament
 Hungarian Quartet, (1953 mono) EMI
 Hungarian Quartet, (1960s stereo) EMI
 Juilliard String Quartet, CBS studio late 60s
 Juilliard String Quartet, CBS (rec. live 1982)
 Kodály Quartet, Naxos
 LaSalle Quartet, DG (reissued on Brilliant Classics)
 Leipziger Streichquartett, MDG
 Lindsays, ASV
 Lydian String Quartet, Centaur
 Medici Quartet, Nimbus
 Melos Quartett, DG
 Orford String Quartet, Delos
 Orion String Quartet, Koch Classics (2008)
 Penderecki String Quartet, Marquis (2013)
 Petersen Quartett, Capriccio
 Prazak Quartet, Praga
 Quatuor Mosaïques, Naïve
 Quartetto Italiano, Decca
 Smetana Quartet, Supraphon
 Suske Quartett, Berlin Classics
 Takács Quartet, Decca (2005)
 Talich Quartet, Calliope
 Taneyev Quartet, Boheme
 Tokyo String Quartet, RCA Red Seal (1993)
 Tokyo String Quartet, Harmonia Mundi (2010)
 Vanbrugh Quartet, Intim Musik (1996)
 Vermeer Quartet, Teldec, (rec. 1984-89)
 Vegh Quartet, (1952 Les Discophiles Français) Music & Arts
 Vegh Quartet, (1972 Telefunken) Naïve-Astrée
 Wihan Quartet, Nimbus
 Yale Quartet, Vanguard

See also

List of compositions by Ludwig van Beethoven
 String Quartets Nos. 1–6, Op. 18 (Beethoven)
 String Quartets Nos. 7–9, Op. 59 – Rasumovsky (Beethoven)
 A Late Quartet

References

Opus 127-130-135